Kensington is a district in London's Royal Borough of Kensington and Chelsea. It may also refer to:

Places

Australia 
 Kensington, New South Wales, an eastern suburb of Sydney
 Kensington, Queensland, a locality
 Kensington, South Australia, an eastern suburb of Adelaide
 Kensington, Victoria, a suburb of Melbourne
 Kensington, Western Australia, a suburb of Perth

Canada 
 Kensington, Prince Edward Island, a town in Prince County, Prince Edward Island
 Kensington, Calgary, Alberta, a neighbourhood
 Kensington, Edmonton, Alberta, a neighbourhood

Greece 
 Kensington-on-Sea, Corfu

New Zealand 
 Kensington, Dunedin, a suburb of Dunedin
 Kensington, Timaru, a suburb of Timaru
 Kensington, Whangārei, a suburb of Whangārei

South Africa 

 Kensington, Cape Town, a northern suburb in Cape Town
 Kensington, Johannesburg, a suburb in eastern Johannesburg,
 Kensington, Port Elizabeth, an inner-city suburb of Port Elizabeth
 Kensington B, a suburb in Randburg, Gauteng

United Kingdom 
 Kensington, London
 Kensington (UK Parliament constituency)
 Royal Borough of Kensington and Chelsea
 Metropolitan Borough of Kensington
 Kensington, Liverpool

United States 
 Kensington, California (San Francisco Bay Area)
 Kensington, San Diego, California
 Kensington, Connecticut
 Kensington, Georgia
 Kensington, Chicago, Illinois
 Kensington, Kansas
 Kensington, Maryland
 Kensington, Michigan
 Kensington, Minnesota
 Kensington, New Hampshire
 Kensington, New York (Long Island)
 Kensington, Brooklyn, New York
 Kensington, Ohio
 New Kensington, Pennsylvania
 Kensington, Philadelphia, Pennsylvania
 Kensington District, Pennsylvania

Roads

London 
 Kensington Gore
 Kensington High Street
 Kensington Road
 Kensington Palace Gardens

Elsewhere
 Kensington Expressway, an expressway in Buffalo, New York
 Kensington Road, Adelaide, Australia

Railway stations 
 Kensington (MARC station), A Commuter Rail station in Kensington, Maryland
 Kensington (MARTA station), a passenger rail station in Decatur, Georgia
 Kensington railway station, Melbourne, Australia
 Kensington/115th Street (Metra station), a commuter railroad station in Chicago, Illinois

Other uses

 Kensington (band), a Dutch musical group
 Kensington (game), a board game
 Kensington, Toowoomba, a heritage house in Queensland
 Kensington Books, a publishing company
 Kensington Computer Products Group, a security and computer accessories company
 Kensington Security Slot, a slot and lock system for securing computer hardware
 Kensington Oval, an international cricket stadium located in Bridgetown, Barbados

See also 

 Kennington (disambiguation)
 Kensington Gardens (disambiguation)
 Kensington Market, in Toronto
 Kensington Market (band), a Canadian musical group
 Kensington Palace 
 Kensington Park (disambiguation)
 Kensington Prairie Elementary School in Surrey, British Columbia, Canada
 Kensington Pride (mango), a commercial mango cultivar from Australia
 Kensington Runestone, a rune stone found in Minnesota, possibly carved by Viking explorers or a hoax
 North Kensington, London
 South Kensington (disambiguation)
 West Kensington (disambiguation)